The Turbomeca Turmo is a family of French turboshaft engines manufacturered for helicopter use. A turboprop version was developed for use with the Bréguet 941 transport aircraft.

Current versions are built in partnership with Rolls-Royce, and the engine is produced under licence by the Chinese Changzhou Lan Xiang Machinery Works  as the WZ-6 and Romanian Turbomecanica, Bucharest, as the Turmo IV-CA.

Design and development
The Turmo was initially developed with a single-stage centrifugal compressor, annular combustion chamber and single stage turbine. Power output was from a single-stage free power turbine and was initially .

During early post-war helicopter development, the use of cold and hot rotor tip-jets was widely investigated. To provide large mass-flow air for efficient operation of the tip-jets, Turbomeca developed a gas turbine driven gas producer, powered by the free power-turbine of the Turmo to deliver the required gas flow.

Variants
Data from:-Jane's all the World's Aircraft 1957–58
Turmo I The initial version of the Turmo; max continuous gearbox output  at 3,000 rpm, at 33,750 rpm gas generator speed.
Turmo IIDeveloped version of the Turmo I; max continuous gearbox output  at 34,000 rpm gas generator speed.
Turmo IIIWith 2-stage free power-turbine, pressure ratio  5.7:1 ;Maximum shaft output , max continuous  at 33,400 rpm
Turmo IIIB
Turmo IIICA  turboshaft powering the Sud-Aviation Frelon prototypes.
Turmo IIIC2 Developed from the IIIC delivering  maximum output
Turmo IIIC3 Maximum rating  at 33,500 rpm for production Super Frelon helicopters
Turmo IIIC4 Military variant.
Turmo IIIC5
Turmo IIIC6
Turmo IIIC7
Turmo IIIDTurboprop for the proposed Breguet Br 942 STOL transport, maximum rating .
Turmo IIID2 at 22,460 free turbine rpm
Turmo IIID3 at 33,500 rpm
Turmo IVB Military Variant
Turmo IVC Civil Variant
Turmo IV-CALicence production in Romania
WZ-6Licence production at the Changzhou Lan Xiang Machinery Works in the People's Republic of China.

Applications
Turboshaft
 Sud-Est SE.3140 Alouette II
 Aérospatiale SA 321 Super Frelon
 Aérospatiale SA 330 Puma
 Bölkow Bo 46
 IAR 330
 SNCASE SE.3200 Frelon
 Turbotrain
 SNCF Class T 2000
 N.300 Naviplane

Turboprop
 Breguet Br 940 Integral
 Bréguet 941
 Breguet 941S

Automobile
 Renault Étoile Filante

Specifications (Turmo IIIC7)

See also

References

Further reading

External links

 Turbomeca website

Turbomeca aircraft engines
1950s turboshaft engines
Mixed-compressor gas turbines